Clinton High School is a public high school located at 112 Milwaukee Road in Clinton, Wisconsin. Serving approximately 361 students in grades 9–12, it is part of the Clinton Community School District.
Mascot of Clinton high school is a Cougar named Clint.

External links
Clinton High School website
Clinton Community School District website
localschooldirectory.com website

Public high schools in Wisconsin
Schools in Rock County, Wisconsin